Andy Reece (born 5 September 1962) is an English footballer.

Reece, a midfielder, joined Bristol Rovers from Dudley Town in 1987. He would become a central figure in the team which won promotion to the Second Division in 1990 and remained there for three seasons. He later joined Hereford United. After joining the police force he was player/manager of Midland Combination side West Midlands Police.

Reece was born in Shrewsbury on 5 September 1962. He started his career as a midfielder at Worcester City before joining Willenhall Town who were competing in the Southern League Premier Division for 1985/86 season..
He joined Dudley Town from August 1986 until August 1987, when he signed for Bristol Rovers from Dudley Town in 1987. He would become a central figure in the team which won promotion to the Second Division in 1990 and remained there for three seasons.
He had loan spells at Walsall from November 1992 to May 1993 and from August 1993 to November 1993. He later joined Hereford United in November 1993, and was there until the end of the 1994/95 season.
After joining the police force he was player/manager of Midland Combination side West Midlands Police for seven years from the 1995/96 season. .
July 2002 he joined Grosvenor Park as player / manager.
Re joined West Midlands Police as player / assistant manager
Reece was due to run the reserve side at Coleshill Town but he quit in July 2011 to join Northern League side Daventry Town as assistant manager.

July 2012 - Daventry Town manager Mark Kinsella left the Evo-Stik Southern League Division One Central club, along with assistant Andy Reece and facilities manager Jason Lee. 
The decision was made by chairman Iain Humphrey as part of a cost-cutting exercise.

September 2012 - Andy Reece was due to take over as Coleshill Town manager but took a position as a scout for Northampton Town.

References

External links
Career Stats

Living people
1962 births
English footballers
Bristol Rovers F.C. players
Hereford United F.C. players
Association football midfielders